Wang Lin (born 3 January 1959) is a Chinese former swimmer who competed in the 1984 Summer Olympics.

References

1959 births
Living people
Chinese male breaststroke swimmers
Olympic swimmers of China
Swimmers at the 1984 Summer Olympics
Swimmers at the 1978 Asian Games
Medalists at the 1978 Asian Games
Asian Games medalists in swimming
Asian Games silver medalists for China
Asian Games bronze medalists for China
20th-century Chinese people